The Microtel Inn & Suites brand is a chain of franchise hotels with 343 locations with 24,947 rooms as of December 31, 2018. The company has locations in Argentina, Canada, Mexico, the Philippines, and the United States.

History
The first location opened in 1989 in suburban Rochester, NY. There are now over three hundred franchises around the world.

On July 21, 2008, Wyndham Hotel Group purchased US Franchise Systems, Inc., owner of the Microtel Inn & Suites and Hawthorn Suites brands, from Global Hyatt. US Franchise Systems had previously sold the America's Best Inn (formerly Best Inns) chain to the Country Hearth Inns chain in 2005. That holding company is now known as America's Best Franchising Inc.

As of 2012, Microtel's logo has changed to match the logo style of Wingate and Hawthorn Suites, both owned by Wyndham Hotels and Resorts.

References

External links
Official website

Wyndham brands
Hotel chains in the Philippines
Companies based in Morris County, New Jersey
Hotels established in 1989